Pope Paschal II (1050  1055 – 21 January 1118), born Ranierius, was head of the Catholic Church and ruler of the Papal States from 13 August 1099 to his death in 1118. A monk of the Abbey of Cluny, he was created the cardinal-priest of San Clemente by Pope Gregory VII (1073–85) in 1073. He was consecrated as pope in succession to Pope Urban II (1088–99) on 19 August 1099. His reign of almost twenty years was exceptionally long for a medieval pope.

Early career
Ranierius was born in Bleda, near Forlì, Romagna. He became a monk at Cluny at an early age.

Papacy 

After Pope Urban II's death, Paschal reacted to the success of the First Crusade by preaching the penitential Crusade of 1101. 

During the long struggle of the papacy with the Holy Roman emperors over investiture, Paschal II zealously carried on the Hildebrandine policy in favor of papal privilege, but with only partial success. Henry V, son of Emperor Henry IV, took advantage of his father's excommunication to rebel, even to the point of seeking out Paschal II for absolution for associating with his father. But, Henry V was even more persistent in maintaining the right of investiture than Emperor Henry IV had been before his death in 1106. The imperial Diet at Mainz invited Paschal II to visit Germany and settle the trouble in January 1106, but the pope in the Council of Guastalla (October 1106) simply renewed the prohibition of investiture.

In the same year he brought to an end the investiture struggle in England, in which Anselm, archbishop of Canterbury, had been engaged with Henry I of England, by retaining to himself exclusive right to invest with the ring and crozier, but recognizing the royal nomination to vacate benefices and the oath of fealty for temporal domains. Paschal went to France at the close of 1106 to seek the mediation of Philip I of France and his son Louis in the imperial struggle, but he returned to Italy in September 1107, his negotiations remaining without result. When Henry V advanced with an army into Italy in order to be crowned, the pope agreed to a compact in February 1111 which stipulated that before receiving the imperial crown, Henry was to abjure all claims to investitures, whilst the pope undertook to compel the prelates and abbots of the empire to restore all the temporal rights and privileges which they held from the crown. Preparations were made for the coronation on 12 February 1111, but the Romans rose in revolt against Henry, and the German king retired, taking the pope and Curia with him.

After 61 days of harsh imprisonment, during which Prince Robert I of Capua's Norman army was repulsed on its rescue mission, Paschal II yielded and guaranteed investiture to the emperor. Henry V was then crowned in St. Peter's on 13 April 1111, and, after exacting a promise that no revenge would be taken for what had happened, withdrew beyond the Alps. The Hildebrandine party was aroused to action, however; a Lateran council of March 1112 declared null and void the concessions extorted by violence; a council held at Vienne in October 1111 excommunicated the emperor; and Paschal II sanctioned the proceeding.

Pope Paschal II ordered the building of the basilica of Santi Quattro Coronati on the ashes of the one burned during the Norman sack of Rome in 1084.

During Paschal's trip to France in 1106–1107, he consecrated the Cluniac church of Notre Dame at La Charité-sur-Loire, the second largest church in Europe at the time.

Towards the end of his pontificate trouble began anew in England; Paschal II complained in 1115 that councils were held and bishops translated without his authorization, and he threatened Henry I with excommunication. Matilda of Tuscany was said to have bequeathed all her allodial lands to the Church upon her death in 1115, but the donation was neither publicly acknowledged in Rome nor is any documentary record of the donation preserved. Emperor Henry V at once laid claim to Matilda's lands as imperial fiefs and forced the pope to flee from Rome. Paschal II returned after the emperor's withdrawal at the beginning of 1118, but died within a few days, on 21 January 1118.

In 1116, Paschal II, at the behest of Count Ramon Berenguer III of Barcelona, issued a crusade for the capture of Tarragona.

During Paschal's papacy some efforts were made by the Byzantine Emperor Alexios I to bridge the schism between the Orthodox and the Catholic Church, but these failed, as Paschal pressed the demand that the patriarch of Constantinople recognise the pope's primacy over "all the churches of God throughout the world" in late 1112. This was something Orthodox Patriarchs Nicholas Grammaticus and John Agapetus could not do in face of opposition from the majority of clergy, the monastic world, and the laity.

Pope Paschal II issued the bull Pie postulatio voluntatis on 15 February 1113. It brought under Papal protection and confirmed as a religious order the Hospital of Saint John of Jerusalem, later known as the Knights Hospitaller and today known as the Sovereign Military Order of Malta. It also confirmed the order's acquisitions and donations in Europe and Asia and exempted it from all authority save that of the pope.

See also
First Council of the Lateran
Concordat of Worms
Cardinals created by Paschal II

Notes

 
11th-century births
1118 deaths
Benedictine popes
Christians of the Crusade of 1101
Christians of the 1113–1115 Balearic Islands expedition
Cluniac Order
Italian Benedictines
Italian popes
People from the Province of Forlì-Cesena
Popes
11th-century popes
12th-century popes
Cardinals created by Pope Gregory VII
Burials at the Archbasilica of Saint John Lateran